Nshimirimana is a surname. Notable people with the surname include:

Abbas Nshimirimana (born 1998), Burundian football player
Adolphe Nshimirimana (died 2015), Burundian military general who served as army chief of staff 
Joachim Nshimirimana (born 1973), Burundian athlete in marathon and long-distance running